Susanne Gossick (born November 12, 1947) is a retired American diver. Competing in the 3 m springboard she won gold medals at the 1967 an American Games and 1968 Olympics and placed fourth at the 1964 Olympics.

During her diving career Gossick won five AAU springboard titles. In 1967, she was voted the Los Angeles Times Woman of the Year, becoming the youngest person ever to receive that award. In 1988, she was inducted into the International Swimming Hall of Fame.

See also
 List of members of the International Swimming Hall of Fame

References

1947 births
Living people
Divers at the 1964 Summer Olympics
Divers at the 1968 Summer Olympics
Olympic gold medalists for the United States in diving
Sportspeople from Chicago
American female divers
Medalists at the 1968 Summer Olympics
Pan American Games gold medalists for the United States
Pan American Games medalists in diving
Divers at the 1967 Pan American Games
Medalists at the 1967 Pan American Games
21st-century American women
20th-century American women